Justice Taft may refer to:

William Howard Taft (1857–1930), chief justice of the United States Supreme Court
Kingsley A. Taft (1903–1970), chief justice of the Ohio Supreme Court
Russell S. Taft (1835–1902), chief justice of the Vermont Supreme Court